Redistricting in Virginia has been a controversial topic due to allegations of gerrymandering. In the 2017 Virginia General Assembly, all of the redistricting reform bills were killed.

Constitutional requirements 
The Virginia Constitution states: "Members of the House of Representatives of the United States and members of the Senate and of the House of Delegates of the General Assembly shall be elected from electoral districts established by the General Assembly. Every electoral district shall be composed of contiguous and compact territory and shall be so constituted as to give, as nearly as is practicable, representation in proportion to the population of the district. The General Assembly shall reapportion the Commonwealth into electoral districts in accordance with this section in the year 2011 and every ten years thereafter."

Congressional districts
The Republican Party lost one of its seats in Congress when a federal court redrew Virginia's 4th congressional district. A suit claimed the district had been racially gerrymandered to give an advantage to white Republicans. The ruling in that case found that the General Assembly in 2012 unconstitutionally packed too many black voters into Bobby Scott's district, weakening the clout of blacks in nearby districts. This ruling allowed Democrat Donald McEachin to represent the 4th District in the newly convened U.S. House of Representatives.

House of Delegates districts
Delegate Mark L. Cole noted that even without gerrymandering, political polarization will exist because of the stark political differences between urban and rural areas, which makes drawing competitive districts impossible in some regions of the state.

On 1 March 2017, the U.S. Supreme Court sent a case involving 12 Virginia House of Delegates districts back to a lower court to rule on 11 of those districts. Richmond Circuit Court Judge W. Reilly Marchant ruled that the constitutionality of the map was "fairly debatable" and therefore upheld it. In June 2018, the U.S. District Court for the Eastern District of Virginia found that the 11 districts unconstitutionally concentrated black voters, depriving them of representation. The Court gave the Virginia legislature until October 30, 2018 to submit a new map, but the Republican-majority Assembly was unable to agree on a map that would also be supported by Democratic Governor Ralph Northam, and the Court instead appointed University of California, Irvine political science professor Bernard Grofman to serve as special master to oversee the redistricting process.

Proposed reforms
Article II, section 6 on apportionment states, "Members of the ... Senate and of the House of Delegates of the General Assembly shall be elected from electoral districts established by the General Assembly. Every electoral district shall be composed of contiguous and compact territory and shall be so constituted as to give, as nearly as is practicable, representation in proportion to the population of the district." The Redistricting Coalition of Virginia proposes either an independent commission or a bipartisan commission that is not polarized. Member organizations include the League of Women Voters of Virginia, AARP of Virginia, OneVirginia2021, the Virginia Chamber of Commerce and the Virginia Organizing Project. Governor Bob McDonnell's Independent Bipartisan Advisory Commission on Redistricting for the Commonwealth of Virginia made its report on April 1, 2011. It made two recommendations for each state legislative house that showed maps of districts more compact and contiguous than those adopted by the General Assembly.

In 2011, the Virginia College and University Redistricting Competition was organized by Professors Michael McDonald of George Mason University and Quentin Kidd of Christopher Newport University. About 150 students on sixteen teams from thirteen schools submitted plans for legislative and U.S. congressional districts. They created districts more compact than the General Assembly's efforts. The "Division 1" maps conformed with the Governor's Executive Order, and did not address electoral competition or representational fairness. In addition to the criteria of contiguity, equipopulation, the federal Voting Rights Act and communities of interest in the existing city and county boundaries, "Division 2" maps in the competition did incorporate considerations of electoral competition and representational fairness. Judges for the cash award prizes were Thomas Mann of the Brookings Institution and Norman Ornstein of the American Enterprise Institute.

In January 2015, Republican State Senator Jill Holtzman Vogel of Winchester and Democratic State Senator Louise Lucas of Portsmouth sponsored a Senate Joint Resolution to establish additional criteria for the Virginia Redistricting Commission of four identified members of political parties, and three other independent public officials. The criteria began with respecting existing political boundaries, such as cities and towns, counties and magisterial districts, election districts and voting precincts. Districts are to be established on the basis of population, in conformance with federal and state laws and court cases, including those addressing racial fairness. The territory is to be contiguous and compact, without oddly shaped boundaries. The commission is prohibited from using political data or election results to favor either political party or incumbent. It passed with a two-thirds majority of 27 to 12 in the Senate, and was then referred to committee in the House of Delegates.

In 2015, at Vesilind v. Virginia State Board of Elections in a Virginia state court, plaintiffs sought to overturn the General Assembly's redistricting in five House of Delegate and six state Senate districts as violations of both the Virginia and U.S. Constitutions because they failed to represent populations in "continuous and compact territory".

The Virginia General Assembly passed HJ 615 in 2019 and SJ 18 in 2020 to amend the state constitution to form a redistricting commission for the 2021 redistricting process. In accordance with Virginia's process for amending the state constitution, this proposed amendment had to pass through the General Assembly in two, concurrent years before being passed on to Virginia voters, who will vote on this referendum in November 2020. The amendment, if added to the Virginia Constitution, will create a sixteen-member commission, composed of eight citizens, two Senate Democrats, two Senate Republicans, two House Democrats, and two House Republicans, to redistrict Virginia, instead of the General Assembly. It will also cement requirements for commission transparency and historic civil rights protections for racial and ethnic minorities in the Virginia Constitution. If the commission cannot agree or if the General Assembly rejects the commission's map twice, the Virginia Supreme Court will redraw the districts in accordance with existing standard, likely with the help of a Special Master. The amendment passed with 65.69% of the vote.

See also
 Elections in Virginia
 2020 United States census
 2020 United States redistricting cycle

References

External links

 
 

Redistricting in the United States
Politics of Virginia